Nature's Symphony in 432 is an album by The Isaacs. It earned the group a Grammy Award nomination for Best Roots Gospel Album.

References

2016 albums
The Isaacs albums